Mine damer og herrer is a 2010 studio album by Danish singer Kim Larsen. It was released on 3 May 2010 on EMI, and was Larsen's first solo album since his 1994 album Hvem kan sige nej til en engel.

It was a huge success on Tracklisten, the official Danish Albums Chart where it stayed at #1 for 7 consecutive weeks (weeks 18-24/2010).

Track listing
 "Udenfor døren"
 "Hold ud"
 "Stud Poker"
 "Botox & Silicone"
 "Kom igen"
 "Danser med dig"
 "Du er min"
 "Næ, næ, næ"
 "Blå lanterne"
 "Bitter frugt"
 "Har du hørt"
 "Mit et og alt"
 "Giv mig en chance"
 "Mænd med måner"

Charts

Certifications

References

2010 albums
Kim Larsen albums
EMI Records albums